The State Committee on Standardization, Metrology and Patents of Azerbaijan Republic is a governmental agency within the Cabinet of Azerbaijan in charge of Azerbaijani technical regulations, metrology, valuation of technical compliance, accreditation, quality standardsin Azerbaijan Republic. The committee is headed by Ramiz Hasanov.

History
In 1906, when Azerbaijan was part of Russian Empire, the authorities established a test point No. 25 in Baku. The chamber of 4 people were in charge of checking and branding decimal scales and weights. In 1909, the first check point of electric meters in the empire was established in Baku. In 1926, the Soviet Azerbaijani authorities instituted mandatory checking of electric meters which were installed throughout the country. Due to developing petroleum industry in Azerbaijan, the need for precise data attracted more attention of authorities and usage of measuring gauges increased. In 1931, Standardization Bureau was established for checking and approving of length and weight measuring devices and new laboratories were opened throughout the country.

In 1966, Standardization Committee was opened and functioned under the jurisdiction of the Cabinet of Ministers of Azerbaijan SSR. A big lab in Ganja and 39 temporary check points were a part of the committee. In 1970, the committee was re-organized and became Azerbaijan SSR Body of Gosstandard of the USSR.
After restoration of independence of Azerbaijan, standardization and metrology in the republic was being regulated by the Standardization and Metrology Center of the Cabinet of Ministers of Azerbaijan (AzGOST) established in 1992. On December 27, 2001 President Heydar Aliyev signed a decree No. 623 establishing State Agency on Standardization, Metrology and Patents (AZSTAND). On November 19, 2008 the agency was transformed into the State Committee on Standardization, Metrology and Patents according to Presidential Decree No. 53.

Structure
Main functions of the committee are carrying out state policies of standardization, metrology, certification and protection of objects of industrial property; preparing and implementing state programs; conducting research on metrology and standardization; organizing protection of objects of the industrial property; updating documents in the sphere of standardization, metrology, certification to increase the competitiveness and quality of goods and services produced in Azerbaijan; ensuring state control over the compliance of imported and exported goods and services to the requirements of standards, metrological rules and norms, rules of certification and protection of industrial property objects, accreditation of testing centers.

Azerbaijani standards are registered by AZSTAND and bear the abbreviation AZS. The regional standards (GOST) adopted by the Interstate Council for Standardization and Certification of the Commonwealth of Independent States (CIS) are also used.

Targets 
The main goal of the committee is achieving national standardization system which qualifies to the international requirements through improving safety, quality and comparativeness of the products and increasing export potential in the country. There are a number of targets in order of achieving this goal:

 Providing free movement for the products and services. 
 Elimination of the unnecessary barriers in international trade. 
 Improving competitiveness of the products, services and human resources both in domestic and foreign markets. 
 Reducing production costs on goods through saving resources. 
 Improving quality of the products, service level and the competence of human resources. 
 Preparing qualified standards for the efficient use of innovations in the production of high-tech goods.

State Committee on Standardization, Metrology and Patents cooperates with the International Electrotechnical Commission (IEC), International Organization for Standardization (ISO), European Standardization Committee (CEN) in order to improve standardization in Azerbaijan.

International Relations 
Following the declaration of independence of Azerbaijan, the Committee of Standardization and Metrology and Patents carries out cooperation with several international and regional organizations.

Azerbaijan has been a member of Economic Cooperation Organization (ECO) since 1992. During the year the committee carries out intergovernmental relations with member countries and exchanges experiences with organizations of the member countries which deal with standardization.

Azerbaijan has joined to eight conventions, agreements and treaties of the World International Property Organization (WIPO).

 The Convention on Establishing the World Intellectual Property Organization 
 The Paris Convention on the Protection of Industrial Property 
 The Cooperation Treaty Patent  
 The Madrid Agreement relating to the International Registration of Marks 
 The Budapest Treaty on the International Recognition of the Deposit of Microorganisms for the Purpose of Patent Procedure 
 The Locarno Agreement on Establishing an International Classification for Industrial Design 
 The Strasburg Agreement on International Patent Classification 
 The Nice Agreement on International Classification of Goods and Services for Registration Marks

Since July 1, 2003 the committee has been a member of International Organization for Standardization (ISO). Through this way committee receives detailed information about activities held in the member countries and discussions in the field of international standardization.

See also
Cabinet of Azerbaijan

References

Government agencies of Azerbaijan
Government agencies established in 2008
2008 establishments in Azerbaijan